The Grand Tour was the principally 17th- to early 19th-century custom of a traditional trip through Europe, with Italy as a key destination, undertaken by upper-class young European men of sufficient means and rank (typically accompanied by a tutor or family member) when they had come of age (about 21 years old).

The custom—which flourished from about 1660 until the advent of large-scale rail transport in the 1840s and was associated with a standard itinerary—served as an educational rite of passage. Though it was primarily associated with the British nobility and wealthy landed gentry, similar trips were made by wealthy young men of other Protestant Northern European nations, and, from the second half of the 18th century, by some South and North Americans.

By the mid-18th century, the Grand Tour had become a regular feature of aristocratic education in Central Europe as well, although it was restricted to the higher nobility. The tradition declined in Europe as enthusiasm for classical culture waned, and with the advent of accessible rail and steamship travel—an era in which Thomas Cook made the "Cook's Tour" of early mass tourism a byword starting in the 1870s.

However, with the rise of industrialization in the United States in the 19th century, American Gilded Age nouveau riche adopted the Grand Tour for both sexes and among those of more advanced years as a means of gaining both exposure and association with the sophistication of Europe. Even those of lesser means sought to mimic the pilgrimage, as satirized in Mark Twain's enormously popular Innocents Abroad in 1869.

The primary value of the Grand Tour lay in its exposure to the cultural legacy of classical antiquity and the Renaissance, and to the aristocratic and fashionably polite society of the European continent. It also provided the only opportunity to view specific works of art, and possibly the only chance to hear certain music.

A Grand Tour could last anywhere from several months to several years. It was commonly undertaken in the company of a cicerone, a knowledgeable guide or tutor.

History
Rome for many centuries had already been the destination of pilgrims, especially during Jubilee when European clergy visited the Seven Pilgrim Churches of Rome.

In Britain, Thomas Coryat's travel book Coryat's Crudities (1611), published during the Twelve Years' Truce, was an early influence on the Grand Tour but it was the far more extensive tour through Italy as far as Naples undertaken by the 'Collector' Earl of Arundel, with his wife and children in 1613–14 that established the most significant precedent. This is partly because he asked Inigo Jones, not yet established as an architect but already known as a 'great traveller' and masque designer, to act as his cicerone (guide).

Larger numbers of tourists began their tours after the Peace of Münster in 1648. According to the Oxford English Dictionary, the first recorded use of the term (perhaps its introduction to English) was by Richard Lassels (c. 1603–1668), an expatriate Roman Catholic priest, in his book The Voyage of Italy, which was published posthumously in Paris in 1670 and then in London. Lassels's introduction listed four areas in which travel furnished "an accomplished, consummate Traveller": the intellectual, the social, the ethical (by the opportunity of drawing moral instruction from all the traveller saw), and the political.

As a young man at the outset of his account of a repeat Grand Tour, the historian Edward Gibbon remarked that "According to the law of custom, and perhaps of reason, foreign travel completes the education of an English gentleman." Consciously adapted for intellectual self-improvement, Gibbon was "revisiting the Continent on a larger and more liberal plan"; most Grand Tourists did not pause more than briefly in libraries. On the eve of the Romantic era he played a significant part in introducing, William Beckford wrote a vivid account of his Grand Tour that made Gibbon's unadventurous Italian tour look distinctly conventional.

The typical 18th-century stance was that of the studious observer travelling through foreign lands reporting his findings on human nature for those unfortunates who stayed at home. Recounting one's observations to society at large to increase its welfare was considered an obligation; the Grand Tour flourished in this mindset.

In essence, the Grand Tour was neither a scholarly pilgrimage nor a religious one, though a pleasurable stay in Venice and a residence in Rome were essential. Catholic Grand Tourists followed the same routes as Protestant Whigs. Since the 17th century, a tour to such places was also considered essential for budding artists to understand proper painting and sculpture techniques, though the trappings of the Grand Tour—valets and coachmen, perhaps a cook, certainly a "bear-leader" or scholarly guide—were beyond their reach.

The advent of popular guides, such as the book An Account of Some of the Statues, Bas-Reliefs, Drawings, and Pictures in Italy published in 1722 by Jonathan Richardson and his son Jonathan Richardson the Younger, did much to popularise such trips, and following the artists themselves, the elite considered travel to such centres as necessary rites of passage. For gentlemen, some works of art were essential to demonstrate the breadth and polish they had received from their tour.

The Grand Tour offered a liberal education, and the opportunity to acquire things otherwise unavailable, lending an air of accomplishment and prestige to the traveller. Grand Tourists would return with crates full of books, works of art, scientific instruments, and cultural artefacts – from snuff boxes and paperweights to altars, fountains, and statuary – to be displayed in libraries, cabinets, gardens, drawing rooms, and galleries built for that purpose. The trappings of the Grand Tour, especially portraits of the traveller painted in continental settings, became the obligatory emblems of worldliness, gravitas and influence. Artists who particularly thrived on the Grand Tour market included Carlo Maratti, who was first patronised by John Evelyn as early as 1645, Pompeo Batoni the portraitist, and the vedutisti such as Canaletto, Pannini and Guardi. The less well-off could return with an album of Piranesi etchings.

The "perhaps" in Gibbon's opening remark cast an ironic shadow over his resounding statement. Critics of the Grand Tour derided its lack of adventure. "The tour of Europe is a paltry thing", said one 18th century critic, "a tame, uniform, unvaried prospect". The Grand Tour was said to reinforce the old preconceptions and prejudices about national characteristics, as Jean Gailhard's Compleat Gentleman (1678) observes: "French courteous. Spanish lordly. Italian amorous. German clownish." The deep suspicion with which Tour was viewed at home in England, where it was feared that the very experiences that completed the British gentleman might well undo him, were epitomised in the sarcastic nativist view of the ostentatiously "well-travelled" maccaroni of the 1760s and 1770s.

Also worth noticing is that the Grand Tour not only fostered stereotypes of the countries visited but also led to a dynamic of contrast between northern and southern Europe. By constantly depicting Italy as a "picturesque place", the travellers also unconsciously degraded Italy as a place of backwardness. This unconscious degradation is best reflected in the famous verses of Lamartine in which Italy is depicted as a "land of the past... where everything sleeps."

In Rome, antiquaries like Thomas Jenkins were also dealers and were able to sell and advise on the purchase of marbles; their price would rise if it were known that the Tourists were interested. Coins and medals, which formed more portable souvenirs and a respected gentleman's guide to ancient history were also popular. Pompeo Batoni made a career of painting the English milordi posed with graceful ease among Roman antiquities. Many continued on to Naples, where they also viewed Herculaneum and Pompeii, but few ventured far into Southern Italy, and fewer still to Greece, then still under Turkish rule.

After the advent of steam-powered transportation around 1825, the Grand Tour custom continued, but it was of a qualitative difference — cheaper to undertake, safer, easier, open to anyone. During much of the 19th century, most educated young men of privilege undertook the Grand Tour. Germany and Switzerland came to be included in a more broadly defined circuit. Later, it became fashionable for young women as well; a trip to Italy, with a spinster aunt as chaperone, was part of the upper-class women's education, as in E. M. Forster's novel A Room with a View.

British travellers were far from alone on the roads of Europe. On the contrary, from the mid-16th century, the grand tour was established as an ideal way to finish off the education of young men in countries such as Denmark, France, Germany, the Netherlands, Poland and Sweden. In spite of this the bulk of research conducted on the Grand Tour has been on British travellers. Dutch scholar Frank-van Westrienen Anna has made note of this historiographic focus, claiming that the scholarly understanding of the Grand Tour would have been more complex if more comparative studies had been carried out on continental travellers.

Recent scholarship on the Swedish aristocracy has demonstrated that Swedish aristocrats, though being relatively poorer than their British peers, from around 1620 and onwards in many ways acted as their British counterparts. After studies at one or two renowned universities, preferably those of Leiden and Heidelberg, the Swedish grand tourists set off to France and Italy, where they spent time in Paris, Rome and Venice and completed the original grand tour on the French countryside. King Gustav III of Sweden made his Grand Tour in 1783–84.

Typical itinerary
The itinerary of the Grand Tour was not set in stone, but was subject to innumerable variations, depending on an individual's interests and finances, though Paris and Rome were popular destinations for most English tourists.

The most common itinerary of the Grand Tour shifted across generations, but the British tourist usually began in Dover, England, and crossed the English Channel to Ostend in Belgium, or to Calais or Le Havre in France. From there the tourist, usually accompanied by a tutor (known colloquially as a "bear-leader") and (if wealthy enough) a troop of servants, could rent or acquire a coach (which could be resold in any city – as in Giacomo Casanova's travels – or disassembled and packed across the Alps), or he could opt to make the trip by riverboat as far as the Alps, either travelling up the Seine to Paris, or up the Rhine to Basel.

Upon hiring a French-speaking guide, as French was the dominant language of the elite in Europe during the 17th and 18th centuries, the tourist and his entourage would travel to Paris. There the traveller might undertake lessons in French, dancing, fencing, and riding. The appeal of Paris lay in the sophisticated language and manners of French high society, including courtly behavior and fashion. This served to polish the young man's manners in preparation for a leadership position at home, often in government or diplomacy.

From Paris he would typically sojourn in urban Switzerland, often in Geneva (the cradle of the Protestant Reformation) or Lausanne. ("Alpinism" or mountaineering developed later, in the 19th century.) From there the traveller would endure a difficult crossing over the Alps (such as at the Great St Bernard Pass), which required dismantling the carriage and larger luggage. If wealthy enough, he might be carried over the hard terrain by servants.

Once in Italy, the tourist would visit Turin (and sometimes Milan), then might spend a few months in Florence, where there was a considerable Anglo-Italian society accessible to travelling Englishmen "of quality" and where the Tribuna of the Uffizi gallery brought together in one space the monuments of High Renaissance paintings and Roman sculpture. After a side trip to Pisa, the tourist would move on to Padua, Bologna, and Venice. The British idea of Venice as the "locus of decadent Italianate allure" made it an epitome and cultural set piece of the Grand Tour.

From Venice the traveller went to Rome to study the ancient ruins and the masterpieces of painting, sculpture, and architecture of Rome's Medieval, Renaissance, and Baroque periods. Some travellers also visited Naples to study music, and (after the mid-18th century) to appreciate the recently discovered archaeological sites of Herculaneum and Pompeii, and perhaps (for the adventurous) an ascent of Mount Vesuvius. Later in the period, the more adventurous, especially if provided with a yacht, might attempt Sicily to see its archeological sites, volcanoes and its baroque architecture, Malta or even Greece itself. But Naples – or later Paestum further south – was the usual terminus.

Returning northward, the tourist might recross the Alps to the German-speaking parts of Europe, visiting Innsbruck, Vienna, Dresden, Berlin and Potsdam, with perhaps a period of study at the universities in Munich or Heidelberg. From there, travellers could visit Holland and Flanders (with more gallery-going and art appreciation) before returning across the Channel to England.

Published accounts

Published accounts of the Grand Tour provided illuminating detail and an often polished first-hand perspective of the experience. Examining some accounts offered by authors in their own lifetimes, Jeremy Black detects the element of literary artifice in these and cautions that they should be approached as travel literature rather than unvarnished accounts. He lists as examples Joseph Addison, John Andrews, William Thomas Beckford (whose Dreams, Waking Thoughts, and Incidents was a published account of his letters back home in 1780–1781, embellished with stream-of-consciousness associations), William Coxe,<ref>Coxe, Sketches of the Natural, Political and Civil State of Switzerland London, 1779; Travels into Poland, Russia, Sweden and Denmark London, 1784; Travels in Switzerland London, 1789. Coxe's travels range far from the Grand Tour pattern.</ref> Elizabeth Craven, John Moore, tutor to successive dukes of Hamilton, Samuel Jackson Pratt, Tobias Smollett, Philip Thicknesse, and Arthur Young.

Although Italy was written as the "sink of iniquity", many travelers were not kept from recording the activities they participated in or the people they met, especially the women they encountered. To the Grand Tourists, Italy was an unconventional country, for "The shameless women of Venice made it unusual, in its own way." Sir James Hall confided in his written diary to comment on seeing "more handsome women this day than I ever saw in my life", also noting "how flattering Venetian dress [was] — or perhaps the lack of it".

Eighteenth- and nineteenth-century Italian women, with their unfamiliar methods and routines, were opposites to the western dress expected of European women in the eighteenth and nineteenth century; their "foreign" ways led to the documentation of encounters with them, providing published accounts of the Grand Tour.

James Boswell in the 18th century courted noble ladies and recorded his progress with his relationships, mentioning that Madame Micheli "Talked of religion, philosophy... Kissed hand often." The promiscuity of Boswell's encounters with Italian elite are shared in his diary and provide further detail on events that occurred during the Grand Tour. Boswell notes "Yesterday morning with her. Pulled up petticoat and showed whole knees... Touched with her goodness. All other liberties exquisite." He describes his time with the Italian women he encounters and shares a part of history in his written accounts.

Lord Byron's letters to his mother with the accounts of his travels have also been published from the early 19th century. Byron spoke of his first enduring Venetian love, his landlord's wife, mentioning that he has "fallen in love with a very pretty Venetian of two and twenty — with great black eyes — she is married — and so am I — we have found & sworn an eternal attachment ... & I am more in love than ever... and I verily believe we are one of the happiest unlawful couples on this side of the Alps." Many tourists enjoyed sexual relations while abroad but to a great extent were well behaved, such as Thomas Pelham, and scholars, such as Richard Pococke, who wrote lengthy letters of their Grand Tour experiences.

Inventor Sir Francis Ronalds' journals and sketches of his 1818–20 tour to Europe and the Near East have been published online. The letters written by sisters Mary and Ida Saxton of Canton, Ohio in 1869 while on a six-month tour offer insight into the Grand Tour tradition from an American perspective.

Immediately following the American Civil War U.S. author and humorist Mark Twain undertook a decidedly modest yet greatly aspiring "grand tour" of Europe, the Middle East, and the Holy Land, which he chronicled in his highly popular satire Innocents Abroad in 1867.  Not only was it the best-selling of Twain's works during his lifetime, it became one of the best-selling travel books of all time.

In literature
Margaret Mitchell's American Civil War-based novel, Gone With The Wind, makes reference to the Grand Tour. Stuart Tartleton, in a conversation with his twin brother, Brent, suspects that their mother is not likely to provide them with a Grand Tour, since they have been expelled from college again. Brent is not concerned, remarking, "What is there to see in Europe? I'll bet those foreigners can't show us a thing we haven't got right here in Georgia". Ashley Wilkes, on the other hand, enjoyed the scenery and music he encountered on his Grand Tour and was always talking about it.

Popular culture
In 1998, the BBC produced an art history series Sister Wendy's Grand Tour presented by British Carmelite nun Sister Wendy. Ostensibly an art history series, the journey takes her from Madrid to Saint Petersburg with stop-offs to see the great masterpieces.

In 2005, British art historian Brian Sewell followed in the footsteps of the Grand Tourists for a 10-part television series Brian Sewell's Grand Tour. Produced by UK's Channel Five, Sewell travelled by car and confined his attention solely to Italy stopping in Rome, Florence, Naples, Pompeii, Turin, Milan, Cremona, Siena, Bologna, Vicenza, Paestum, Urbino, Tivoli and concluding at a Venetian masked ball.  Material relating to this can be found in the Brian Sewell Archive held by the Paul Mellon Centre for Studies in British Art.

In 2009, the Grand Tour featured prominently in a BBC/PBS miniseries based on Little Dorrit by Charles Dickens. Set mainly in Venice, it portrayed the Grand Tour as a rite of passage.

Kevin McCloud presented Kevin McCloud's Grand Tour on Channel 4 in 2009 with McCloud retracing the tours of British architects.

See also
 Gap year
 Hippie trail
 Walking tour
 Overseas experience
 Field trip

Footnotes

References

Notes

Sources

Elizabeth Bohls and Ian Duncan, ed. (2005). Travel Writing 1700–1830 : An Anthology. Oxford University Press. 
James Buzard (2002), "The Grand Tour and after (1660–1840)", in The Cambridge Companion to Travel Writing. 
 Paul Fussell (1987), "The Eighteenth Century and the Grand Tour", in The Norton Book of Travel, 
Edward Chaney (1985), The Grand Tour and the Great Rebellion: Richard Lassels and 'The Voyage of Italy' in the seventeenth century(CIRVI, Geneva-Turin, 1985.
Edward Chaney (2004), "Richard Lassels": entry in the Oxford Dictionary of National Biography.
Edward Chaney, The Evolution of the Grand Tour: Anglo-Italian Cultural Relations since the Renaissance (Frank Cass, London and Portland OR, 1998; revised edition, Routledge 2000). .
Edward Chaney ed. (2003), The Evolution of English Collecting (Yale University Press, New Haven and London, 2003).
Edward Chaney and Timothy Wilks, The Jacobean Grand Tour: Early Stuart Travellers in Europe (I.B. Tauris, London, 2014). 
Lisa Colletta ed. (2015), The Legacy of the Grand Tour: New Essays on Travel, Literature, and Culture (Fairleigh Dickinson University Press, London, 2015). 
 Sánchez-Jáuregui-Alpañés, Maria Dolores, and Scott Wilcox. The English Prize: The Capture of the Westmorland, An Episode of the Grand Tour. New Haven, CT: Yale University Press, 2012. .
Stephens, Richard. A Catalogue Raisonné of Francis Towne (1739–1816)  (London: Paul Mellon Centre, 2016), .
Geoffrey Trease, The Grand Tour (Yale University Press) 1991.
Andrew Witon and Ilaria Bignamini, Grand Tour: The Lure of Italy in the Eighteenth-Century, Tate Gallery exhibition catalogue, 1997.
Clare Hornsby (ed.) "The Impact of Italy: The Grand Tour and Beyond", British School at Rome, 2000.
Ilaria Bignamini and Clare Hornsby, "Digging and Dealing in Eighteenth Century Rome" (Yale University Press, New Haven and London, 2010).Roma Britannica: Art Patronage and Cultural Exchange in Eighteenth-Century Rome, eds. D. Marshall, K. Wolfe and S. Russell, British School at Rome, 2011, pp. 147–70.
Henry S. Belden III, Grand Tour of Ida Saxton McKinley and Sister Mary Saxton Barber 1869, (Canton, Ohio) 1985.

External links

 The Grand Tour page for English course taught at the University of Michigan
 Grand Tour online at the Getty Museum
 In Our Time: The Grand Tour: Jeremy Black, Edward Chaney and Chloe Chard
 Wanderings in the Land of Ham'' by a daughter of Japhet, London : Longman, Brown, Green, Longmans, & Roberts, 1858. A description of an Oriental Grand Tour at the Internet Archive Digital Library.

Types of tourism
Types of travel
Cultural tourism
Rites of passage